Two is a 2002 French drama film directed by Werner Schroeter and starring Isabelle Huppert.

Cast
 Isabelle Huppert - Magdalena / Maria
 Bulle Ogier - Anna, the mother
 Manuel Blanc - Man with the flower / Russian officer / Henri L. / French officer / Man on the beach
 Arielle Dombasle - Professor Barbez
 Annika Kuhl - Erika, the mistress
 Robinson Stévenin - Young man on the bike
 Philippe Reuter - Hans
 Pascal Bongard - Alfred
 Jean-François Stévenin - Man in the car
 Dominique Frot - The adoptive mother
 Rita Loureiro - Julia / Young girl in Paris
 Philippe Carta - Taxi driver / sailor
 Tim Fischer - Josephine Baker
 Rogério Samora - Sintra castle keeper
 Zazie De Paris - Zazie
 Hovnatan Avédikian - Jesus
 Elisabeth Cooper - Elisabeth
 Alexia Voulgaridou - Singer
 Delphine Marque - Claudia

See also
 Isabelle Huppert on screen and stage

References

External links

2002 films
French drama films
2000s French-language films
2002 drama films
Films directed by Werner Schroeter
Films produced by Paulo Branco
2000s French films